The Kindiependent Collective is a Seattle-based community of children's music performers and supporters who collaborate on recordings, performances and music business related projects. The collective is composed of Recess Monkey, Caspar Babypants, The Not-Its!, The Harmonica Pocket, Johnny Bregar, The Board of Education and Brian Vogan and His Good Buddies.

Group performances 
Kindiependent organizes several music series shows across the Seattle area including the Kids Rock Series at the Mount Baker Community Club. In collaboration with the Northwest Folklife Festival, they showcase a daylong collection of family music performances each Memorial Day.

Music collaborations 
Members of the Kindiependent Collective sometimes assemble to create collaborative music in mixed up pairings. Collaborations have included songs such as "Vagabond Worms" and "Kids' Table" as well as a collection of six Birthday-themed songs frequently played on SiriusXM's Kids Place Live Channel 78, entitled "The Happy Birthday EP."

References

External links 
 Kindiependent
 Recess Monkey
 Caspar Babypants
 The Not-Its!
 The Harmonica Pocket
 Johnny Bregar
 The Board of Education
 Brian Vogan and his Good Buddies
 "Vagabond Worms"
 "Kids' Table"

American children's musical groups